Llanerch-y-medd Football Club is a Welsh football team based in Llannerch-y-medd, Anglesey, Wales.  The team currently play in the North Wales Coast East Football League Premier Division, which is at the fourth tier of the Welsh football league system.

History
The club played in the Gwynedd League before joining the Welsh Alliance League for the 2014–15 season. The club remained in that league until the end of the 2018–19 season when they resigned from the league and demoted themselves to the Gwynedd League after many of their playing squad left for other clubs.

The 2019–20 season in the Gwynedd League saw the club finish bottom of the table, having amassed zero points from 19 games in a season curtailed due to the COVID-19 pandemic.

They joined the newly formed North Wales Coast East Football League Division One from 2020. In their first season in the league they were league champions.

Honours

North Wales Coast West Football League Division One – Champions (1): 2021–22
North Wales Coast West Football League Division One Cup – Runners-up: 2021–22 
Gwynedd League – Champions (1): 2013–14
Anglesey League – Champions (2): 1983–84, 1984–85
 Anglesey League – Division Two Champions (2): 1982–83, 1985–86
North Wales Coast FA Junior Challenge Cup – Winners: 1984–95
Dargie Cup – Winners (2): 1985–86, 2011–12
Megan Cup – Winners (5): 1983–84, 1984–85, 1985–86, 2002–03, 2011–12
Elias Cup – Winners (2): 1978–79, 2011–12
Thomas and Williams Cup – Winners (1): 2005–06

External links
Club official website

References

Football clubs in Wales
North Wales Coast Football League clubs
Sport in Anglesey
Gwynedd League clubs
Anglesey League clubs
Welsh Alliance League clubs